Katarzyna Ueberhan (born 26 August 1975) is a Polish politician. She was elected to the Sejm (9th term) representing the constituency of Poznań.

References 

Living people
1975 births
Politicians from Poznań
21st-century Polish politicians
21st-century Polish women politicians
Members of the Polish Sejm 2019–2023
Women members of the Sejm of the Republic of Poland